Pilar Velázquez (born 13 February 1946) is a Spanish actress.

Born as  María del Pilar Velázquez Llorente in Madrid, she made her debut in 1964 at the Teatro Español, with the drama Caminos de Damasco. Between 1966 and 1977 she starred in about 50 films and television roles; she was active in Italian genre cinema, especially in Spaghetti Westerns. In 1979 Velázquez married the Spanish singer and actor Miguel Gallardo.

References

External links 
 

Spanish film actresses
1946 births
Actresses from Madrid
Living people
Spaghetti Western actresses